The greenstripe barb, silver barb or striped barb (Puntius vittatus) is a tropical freshwater and brackish fish belonging to the subfamily Cyprininae of the family Cyprinidae. It originates in inland waters in Asia, and is found in Pakistan, India, and Sri Lanka.

The greenstripe barb is an open water, substrate egg-scatterer, and adults do not guard the eggs.

Taxonomy
It was originally described as Puntius vittatus by F. Day in 1865, and has also been referred to in scientific literature as Barbus vittatus.  The word "vittatus" means "striped lengthwise", and is pronounced "vy-TAH-tus".

Description
The fish will grow in length of up to 5 centimeters (2 inches).

Habitat
It natively inhabits ponds, streams and lakes in plains. It is often found in rice fields and is known to enter brackish water. They live in a tropical climate in water with a 6.0 - 6.5 pH, a water hardness of 8 - 15 dGH, and a temperature range of 68 - 75 °F (20 - 24 °C).  It feeds mainly on filamentous algae and blue-green algae.

Importance to humans
The greenstripe barb is of commercial importance in the aquarium trade and is also commonly used as bait.

See also
 List of freshwater aquarium fish species

References 

 

Puntius
Taxa named by Francis Day
Fish described in 1865